Kandapola is a village in Nuwara Eliya, Sri Lanka. It is located within the Central Province.

See also
List of towns in Central Province, Sri Lanka

External links

Populated places in Nuwara Eliya District